Banco à Bangkok pour OSS 117 released in the USA as Shadow of Evil  is a 1964 French/Italian international co-production Eurospy spy-fi film.  It was based on Jean Bruce's 1960 novel Lila de Calcutta, the 74th OSS 117 novel. It was the second OSS 117 film directed by André Hunebelle and produced by Paul Cadéac, the first in the series in colour, the first co-produced by the Italian company Da.Ma. Cinematografica and the last to star Kerwin Mathews as OSS 117.

The film was shot on Thai locations and featured action scenes arranged by Hunebelle's stunt coordinator Claude Carliez with production design by René Moulaert.

Plot
Secret Agent OSS 117, Colonel Hubert Bonisseur de La Bath (Kerwin Mathews) is sent to Thailand following the murder of OSS agent Christopher Lemmon.  Lemmon had been investigating the break out of plague epidemics in India following health workers inoculating the locals to protect them from cholera.  Lemmon had discovered that the medicine made in Hogby Laboratories in Bangkok had been switched with plague germs infecting the population with fatal results.

After surviving several assassination attempts, OSS 117 infiltrates the secret lair of Dr. Sinn (Robert Hossein), an Indian hypnotist and psychologist with the help of his sister Lila (Pier Angeli). Dr Sinn is the cape wearing supervillain and mastermind mad scientist of a Malthusian organisation known as the "People Elect".  The "People Elect" (inoculated by Dr Sinn for immunity) desire to spread plague around the world to reduce the Earth's population and stop atomic testing that is ruining the planet.

Cast 
 Kerwin Mathews as Hubert Bonisseur de La Bath
 Pier Angeli as Lila Sinn, the doctor's sister
 Robert Hossein as Dr Sinn
 Dominique Wilms as Eva Davidson, Leacock's secretary
 Gamil Ratib as Akhom 
 Henri Virlojeux as Leacock 
 Jacques Mauclair as Mr Smith 
 Henri Guégan as Karloff 
 Raoul Billerey as Christopher Lemmon 
 Jacques Hilling as Hogby

References

External links
 
 original French film trailer https://www.youtube.com/watch?v=tycLRoQtpbg

1964 films
1960s spy thriller films
Films directed by André Hunebelle
Films set in Thailand
Films shot in Thailand
1960s French-language films
French spy thriller films
French sequel films
1960s French films